Klaas Slootmans (born 8 September, 1983 in Halle, Belgium) is a Belgian-Flemish politician for the Vlaams Belang party who currently serves as a member of the Flemish Parliament for the Flemish Brabant region. He was first elected in 2019. Following his election he was designated as a Senator by the party. Slootmans graduated with a master's degree in political science from the Free University of Brussels before becoming a politician.

References 

Living people

Members of the Flemish Parliament

1983 births
Vlaams Belang politicians
21st-century Belgian politicians